Louis de Crestou (1756–1798) served in the French military in the American War of Independence and in the French Revolutionary Wars. He died 27 August 1798 at the Battle of Castlebar, a French officer of the United Irishmen Rebellion.

He was part of the expedition to Ireland. On 20 Fructidor 1798, at the Battle of Castlebar, he headed 40 of the third cavalry regiment. He attacked an English regiment, taking off four pieces of cannon and sending the gunners to flee.

1756 births
1798 deaths
Battles of the Irish Rebellion of 1798
French soldiers